Le Rosier miraculeux, released in the US as The Wonderful Rose-Tree and in the UK as  The Magical Rose Tree, is a 1904 French short silent film directed by Georges Méliès.

Plot
According to Méliès's catalogue description:

Release and rediscovery
The Wonderful Rose-Tree, advertised as having been based on a legend from Hinduism, was released by Méliès's Star Film Company and is numbered 634–636 in its catalogues. It was sold both in black-and-white and, at a higher price, in a hand-coloured version. Méliès's catalogue says that the film "was made especially for coloring. Its charm and its delicate beauty are very materially enhanced by the intelligent and harmonious coloring of our artists." The film was registered for American copyright at the Library of Congress on 11 October 1904.

The film was presumed lost until the 2010s, when documentary filmmakers of Saving Brinton identified a single, damaged, but nearly complete black-and-white print in a collection that had belonged to Frank Brinton, a Midwestern American traveling showman of Méliès's era. The Brinton collection was also found to contain another Méliès film presumed lost, The Triple-Headed Lady. The Wonderful Rose-Tree was screened, for the first time since its rediscovery, at the Pordenone Silent Film Festival in 2017.

References

External links

Films directed by Georges Méliès
French black-and-white films
French silent short films
1900s rediscovered films
Rediscovered French films
1900s French films